Leonardo Rodríguez (born 1966) is a former Argentinian footballer, who won King Fahd Cup and twice Copa America.

Leonardo Rodriguez can also refer to:
Leonardo Rodríguez Díaz, Ministry of Industry (Spain) in 1919
Leonardo Rodríguez Alcaine (1919–2005),  Mexican trade union leader and politician
Leo Rodríguez (baseball) (1929–2011), Mexican baseballer
Leonardo Rodríguez Solís (active since 1977), Argentinian cinematographer
Leonardo Rodríguez, Venezuelan discus thrower, got silver medal in 1979 South American Youth Championships in Athletics
Leonardo Rodriguez Pereira (born 1986), Brazilian footballer
Leonardo Rodriguez, Venezuelan shooter, got silver medal in Shooting at the 2013 Bolivarian Games
Miguel Leonardo Rodríguez, Venezuelan Ministry of Environment and Natural Resources 2013–2014

See also 
Leo Rodriguez (singer) (born 1989), Brazilian singer and songwriter